Bol Glacier is a glacier between Darkowski Glacier and Condit Glacier, flowing north from the Cathedral Rocks into Ferrar Glacier in Victoria Land. It was named by the Advisory Committee on Antarctic Names in 1964, for Lieutenant Commander Peter Bol, U.S. Navy, chaplain with the winter party of 1956 at the Naval Air Facility on McMurdo Sound.

References
 

Glaciers of Scott Coast